Suavotrochus lubrica is a species of sea snail, a marine gastropod mollusk in the family Solariellidae.

Distribution
This species occurs in the Gulf of Mexico and in the Caribbean Sea.

Description 
The maximum recorded shell length is 4 mm.

Habitat 
Minimum recorded depth is 73 m. Maximum recorded depth is 1472 m.

References

 Rosenberg, G., F. Moretzsohn, and E. F. García. 2009. Gastropoda (Mollusca) of the Gulf of Mexico, Pp. 579–699 in Felder, D.L. and D.K. Camp (eds.), Gulf of Mexico–Origins, Waters, and Biota. Biodiversity. Texas A&M Press, College Station, Texas.

External links

lubricus
Gastropods described in 1881